is one of the five wards of Kumamoto City, Japan. Meaning literally "east ward," it is bordered by the Kita-ku, Chūō-ku, Minami-ku and also by the towns of Kikuyō, Mashiki and Kashima. As of 2012, it has a population of 188,546 people and an area of 50.32 km2.

External links

Wards of Kumamoto